Mustafa Hussain Ansari (born 21 March 1945, died 27 April 2006 in Srinagar) was a Kashmiri writer and scholar.

Biography

Born in the Ansari family of Srinagar, which wields significant religious and political clout over a vast section of population of the Valley, Maulana Mustafa Ansari was best known for his oratory skills. His appeal transcended sectarian lines, and followers of various schools of thought came to him with their questions, doubts, and advice. He was often called to defuse explosive situations and to douse the flames of discord created by misunderstandings in many parts of Kashmir.

Death
Ansari died after a brief illness on 27 April 2006 in Srinagar. Tens of thousands attended his funeral procession.

Works

Commentary and translations

 Kashf-ul-Aneeq-fi-Sharh-e-Qanoon-al-Ameeq: Kashmiri translation and commentary of the holy Qur'an.1975
 Minhajul Qur'an: Urdu translation and commentary of holy Qur'an. 2002
 Misbahul Qur'an (Kashmiri commentary)
 Sharh-e-Nahjul Balagha in Kashmiri (Unpublished)

Philosophy

 Al-Meezan
 Islam May Haq-e-Talaaq
 Khayabaan
 Mujrim
 Huqquq-ul-Ebaad
 Rakht-e-Safar (last work)

Society

 Mairay JigarKa Lahoo
 Noor Say Naar Tak
 Gina Say Zina Tak

Biography

 Aftab-e-Nubuwat: First Published 1973, Second edition: 2006
 Qateel-e-Nainava- Imam Hussain and his Revolution - 2006
 Mard-e-Ahan: Biography of Imam Ali
 Marde Na Mutnahi
 Arman
 Aakhri Tabasumm: Biography of Hazrat Ali Asghar, youngest martyr in the battle fields of Karbala

Rejoinders

 Jalwa-e-Toor
 Ammed-e-Madani Bajawab-e-Kaleed-e-Ludani
 Imam Gayab Ba Jawab-e-Imam Gayab
 Islam may Haqe Talaq

Historical novels

 Qabeela
 Saazish
 Intiqam
 Baghavat

Poetry

 Safar-e-Natamaam

References

1945 births
2006 deaths
People from Srinagar
Novelists from Jammu and Kashmir
Kashmiri writers
20th-century Indian poets
20th-century Indian novelists
20th-century Indian biographers
20th-century Indian translators
20th-century Indian essayists